Dale Fennell (born 3 June 1957) is an English former professional rugby league footballer who played in the 1970s and 1980s.

Background
Dale Fennell's birth was registered in Pontefract district, West Riding of Yorkshire, England, he was a pupil at Normanton Grammar School.

Playing career

International honours
Dale Fennell represented Great Britain (Under-24s) (alongside teammates; Peter Smith and Steve Evans) in the 8-30 defeat by Australia in the 1978 Kangaroo tour of Great Britain and France match, at Craven Park, Hull on Wednesday 4 October 1978, in front of a crowd of 6,418.

Championship appearances
Dale Fennell played in Featherstone Rovers' Championship victory during the 1976–77 season.

County Cup Final appearances
Dale Fennell played  in Featherstone Rovers' 12-16 defeat by Leeds in the 1976–77 Yorkshire County Cup Final during the 1976–77 season at Headingley Rugby Stadium, Leeds on Saturday 16 October 1976, in front of a crowd of 7,645.

Club career
Dale Fennell made his début for Featherstone Rovers playing  against St. Helens at Knowsley Road, St. Helens on Friday 22 August 1975, and he played his last match for Featherstone Rovers during the 1979–80 season, he was transferred from Featherstone Rovers to Wakefield Trinity, he made his début for Wakefield Trinity during February 1980, he played his last match for Wakefield Trinity during the 1981–82 season, he was transferred from Wakefield Trinity to Bradford Northern, he scored Bradford Northern's first ever competitive 4-point try in the 24th minute against Whitehaven during the first match of the 1983–84 season at Recreation Ground, Whitehaven.

Genealogical information
Dale Fennell is the son of the rugby league footballer; Jack Fennell, the nephew of the rugby league footballer; Thomas Smales, and the brother-in-law of the rugby league footballer; Ian Sheldon.

References

External links
Jackie Fennell and Dale Fennell at marklaspalmas.blogspot.co.uk
Dale Fennell at marklaspalmas.blogspot.co.uk
Photograph "Parading the Championship Trophy around Post Office Road after the last home match of the 1976–77 season (Fennell (standing at the right-end) wearing the base of the Championship Trophy as a hat)" at marklaspalmas.blogspot.co.uk
Photograph "Fennell scores - Dale Fennell scores against Leigh at Odsal. - Date: 23/01/1983" at rlhp.co.uk

1957 births
Living people
Bradford Bulls players
English rugby league players
Featherstone Rovers players
Huddersfield Giants players
Rugby league five-eighths
Rugby league halfbacks
Rugby league players from Pontefract
Wakefield Trinity players